<noinclude>

The UK Singles Chart is one of many music charts compiled by the Official Charts Company that calculates the best-selling singles of the week in the United Kingdom. Before 2004, the chart was only based on the sales of physical singles. New Musical Express (NME) magazine had published the United Kingdom record charts for the first time in 1952. NME originally published only a top 12 (although the first chart had a couple of singles that were tied so a top 15 was announced) but this was gradually extended to encompass a top 20 by October 1954. This list shows singles that peaked in the top 10 of the UK Singles Chart during 1953, as well as singles which peaked in 1952 and 1954 but were in the top 10 in 1953. The entry date is when the single appeared in the top 10 for the first time (week ending, as published by the Official Charts Company, which is six days after the chart is announced).

Eighty singles were in the top 10 in 1953. Nineteen singles from 1952 remained in the top 10 for several weeks at the beginning of the year, while "Oh Mein Papa" by Eddie Calvert, "Chicka Boom" by Guy Mitchell and "Let's Have a Party" by Winifred Atwell were all released in 1953 but did not reach their peak until 1954. "You Belong to Me" by Jo Stafford, "Comes A-Long A-Love" by Kay Starr, "Takes Two to Tango" by Louis Armstrong, "Cowpuncher's Cantata" by Max Bygraves, "Walkin' to Missouri" by Tony Brent and "Britannia Rag" by Winifred Atwell were the singles from 1952 to reach their peak in 1953. Seventeen artists scored multiple entries in the top 10 in 1953. David Whitfield, Dean Martin, Eddie Fisher and Perry Como were among the many artists who achieved their first UK charting top 10 single in 1953.

The 1952 Christmas number-one, "Here in My Heart" by Al Martino, remained at number-one for the first three weeks of 1953. The first new number-one single of the year was "You Belong to Me" by Jo Stafford. Overall, thirteen different singles peaked at number-one in 1953, with Frankie Laine (3) having the most singles hit that position.

Background

Multiple entries
Eighty singles charted in the top 10 in 1953, with sixty-three singles reaching their peak this year. Eleven songs were recorded by several artists with each version reaching the top 10:
"(How Much Is) That Doggie in the Window" - Lita Roza, Patti Page
"Answer Me" - David Whitfield, Frankie Laine 
"Because You're Mine" - Nat King Cole, Mario Lanza (both peaked 1952)
"Broken Wings" - Art and Dotty Todd, The Stargazers
"Dragnet" - Ray Anthony and His Orchestra, Ted Heath & His Music
"Faith Can Move Mountains" - Johnnie Ray & The Four Lads (peaked 1952), Nat King Cole
"I Saw Mommy Kissing Santa Claus" - The Beverley Sisters, Jimmy Boyd
"In a Golden Coach (There's a Heart of Gold)" - Billy Cotton & His Band, Dickie Valentine
"Swedish Rhapsody" - Mantovani, Ray Martin
"Terry's Theme from Limelight" - Frank Chacksfield, Ron Goodwin, Jimmy Young (version known as "Eternally")

Seventeen artists scored multiple entries in the top 10 in 1953. American Frankie Laine secured the record for most top 10 hits in 1953 with eight hit singles.

David Whitfield was one of a number of artists with two top 10 entries, including the number-one single "Answer Me". Al Martino, Dickie Valentine, Mantovani, Ted Heath & His Music and Tony Brent were among the other artists who had multiple top 10 entries in 1953.

Chart debuts
Thirty-eight artists achieved their first top 10 single in 1953, either as a lead or featured artist. Of these, three went on to record another hit single that year: Billy Cotton and His Band, Frank Chacksfield and Jimmy Boyd. David Whitfield, Dickie Valentine and Ted Heath & His Music all peaked in the top ten with two more songs. Eddie Fisher had four other entries in his breakthrough year.

The following table (collapsed on desktop site) does not include acts who had previously charted as part of a group and secured their first top 10 solo single.

Songs from films
Original songs from various films entered the top 10 throughout the year. These included "Terry's Theme" (from Limelight), "The Song from the Moulin Rouge (Where Is Your Heart)" (Moulin Rouge), "Swedish Rhapsody" (The Stranger Left No Card) and "Chicka Boom" (Those Redheads from Seattle).

Best-selling singles
Until 1970 there was no universally recognised year-end best-sellers list. However, in 2011 the Official Charts Company released a list of the best-selling single of each year in chart history from 1952 to date. According to the list, "I Believe" by Frankie Laine is officially recorded as the biggest-selling single of 1953.

Top-ten singles
Key

Entries by artist

The following table shows artists who achieved two or more top 10 entries in 1953, including singles that reached their peak in 1952 or 1954. The figures include both main artists and featured artists, while appearances on ensemble charity records are also counted for each artist. The total number of weeks an artist spent in the top 10 in 1953 is also shown.

Notes

 "Dragnet" reached its peak of number seven on 14 January 1954 (week ending).
 "Rags to Riches" reached its peak of number three on 14 January 1954 (week ending).
 "Oh Mein Papa" reached its peak of number one on 14 January 1954 (week ending).
 "Cowpuncher's Cantanta" re-entered the top 12 at number 8 on 8 January 1953; at number 6 on 29 January 1953 (week ending) for 5 weeks and at number 10 on 12 March 1953 (week ending).
 "Britannia Rag" re-entered the top 12 at number 12 on 15 January 1953 (week ending) for 5 weeks.
 "Because You're Mine" (Nat King Cole version) re-entered the top 12 at number 10 on 29 January 1953 (week ending) and at number 11 on 19 February 1953 (week ending).
 "Faith Can Move Mountains" (Johnnie Ray and The Four Lads version) re-entered the top 12 at number 9 on 15 January 1953 (week ending).
 "Walkin' to Missouri" re-entered the top 12 at number 7 on 15 January 1953 (week ending) for 5 weeks
 "Faith Can Move Mountains" (Nat King Cole version) re-entered the top 12 at number 12 on 22 January 1953 (week ending) for 2 weeks and at number 10 on 12 February 1953 (week ending).
 "Outside of Heaven" re-entered the top 12 at number 12 on 7 May 1953 (week ending).
 "Make It Soon" re-entered the top 12 at number 10 on 19 March 1953 (week ending) for 3 weeks.
 "Everything I Have Is Yours" re-entered the top 12 at number 8 on 12 February 1953 (week ending) for 4 weeks.
 "She Wears Red Feathers" re-entered the top 12 at number 12 on 18 June 1953 (week ending).
 "Broken Wings" (Stargazers version) re-entered the top 12 at number 12 on 5 March 1953 (week ending) for 11 weeks.
 "Somebody Stole My Gal" re-entered the top 12 at number 7 on 30 April 1953 (week ending) for 4 weeks; at number 12 on 4 June 1953 (week ending) and at number 11 on 13 August 1953 (week ending).
"Tell Me a Story" re-entered the top 12 at number 12 on 17 September 1953 (week ending).
"Coronation Rag" re-entered the top 12 at number 12 on 4 June 1953 (week ending) for 5 weeks.
 "The Song from the Moulin Rouge (Where Is Your Heart)" re-entered the top 12 at number 10 on 19 November 1953 (week ending) and at number 12 on 10 December 1953 (week ending).
 "Rachel" re-entered the top 12 at number 12 on 17 September 1953 (week ending).
 "Seven Lonely Days" re-entered the top 12 at number 11 on August 1953 (week ending) and at number 10 on 27 August 1953 (week ending) for 4 weeks.
 "Say You're Mine Again" re-entered the top 12 at number 7 on 10 September 1953 (week ending) for 4 weeks.
 "Can't I" re-entered the top 12 at number 11 on 24 September 1953 (week ending) for 4 weeks and at number 10 on 5 November 1953 (week ending).
 "Kiss" re-entered the top 12 at number 7 on 8 October 1953 (week ending) for 7 weeks.
 "Flirtation Waltz" re-entered the top 12 at number 19 on 15 October 1953 (week ending) and at number 12 on 12 November 1953 (week ending).
 "Answer Me" (David Whitfield version) re-entered the top 12 at number 12 on 4 February 1954 (week ending).
 "Swedish Rhapsody" (Mantovani version) re-entered the top 12 at number 12 on 4 March 1954 (week ending).
 "Poppa Piccolino (Papaveri e papere)" re-entered the top 12 at number 5 on 14 January 1954 (week ending) for 2 weeks.
 "Dragnet" (Ted Heath and His Music version) re-entered the top 12 at number 9 on 3 December 1953 (week ending); at number 11 on 17 December 1953 (week ending); at number 11 on 21 January 1954 (week ending) and at number 12 on 11 February 1954 (week ending).
 "Chicka Boom" re-entered the top 12 at number 8 on 21 January 1954 (week ending) for 6 weeks.
 "Crying in the Chapel" re-entered the top 12 at number 7 on 17 December 1953 (week ending) for 5 weeks.
 "I Saw Mommy Kissing Santa Claus" (The Beverley Sisters version) re-entered the top 12 at number 6 on 17 December 1953 (week ending) for 4 weeks.
 "Swedish Rhapsody" (Ray Martin version) re-entered the top 12 at number 4 on 24 December 1953 (week ending) for 3 weeks.
 "Ricochet" re-entered the top 12 at number 12 on 14 January 1954 (week ending) for 4 weeks.
 "Rags to Riches" re-entered the top 12 at number 3 on 14 January 1954 (week ending) for 10 weeks.
 Figure includes single that peaked in 1952.
 Figure includes single that peaked in 1954.
 Figures includes single that first charted in 1952 but peaked in 1953.

See also
1953 in British music
List of number-one singles from the 1950s (UK)

References
General

Specific

External links
1953 singles chart archive at the Official Charts Company (click on relevant week)

1953 record charts
1953
Top 10 singles